Angelo Venosa (14 August 1954 – 17 October 2022) was a Brazilian sculptor.

Life and career
Born in São Paulo, the son of two Italian immigrants, Venosa studied art at the Escola Brasil in his hometown, industrial design  at the Rio de Janeiro State University and followed courses at Escola de Artes Visuais do Parque Lage. 

Venosa started his artistic career in 1974, and got notoriety in the 1980s, as part of the  movement. His sculptures are characterized from the use of different materials, of both industrial and natural origin. He took part in several notable festivals, including the São Paulo Art Biennial and of the Venice Biennale. Among his best known works is "A Baleia" ("The Whale"), a public work installed in Leme Beach, in the south of Rio de Janeiro. His last work was the installation "Catilina", exposed at the Paço Imperial. He died of the consequences of amyotrophic lateral sclerosis, at the age of 68.

References

External links 
 
 Angelo Venosa at Enciclopédia Itaú Cultural

1954 births
2022 deaths
People from São Paulo
Brazilian sculptors 
Deaths from motor neuron disease
Rio de Janeiro State University alumni